Salvia honania is an annual or biennial plant that is native to fields and wet open areas in Henan and Hubei provinces in China. Inflorescences are widely spaced 5-9 flowered verticillasters in terminal racemes or panicles.

Notes

honania
Flora of China